HMS Matapan (D43) was a later or 1943  fleet destroyer of the Royal Navy (RN). She was named after the Battle of Cape Matapan between the Royal Navy and the Regia Marina, which ended in a decisive victory for the RN force, resulting in the destruction of three cruisers and two destroyers of the Italian Navy and was a heavy blow to the Italians. So far, she has been the only ship of the Royal Navy to bear that name.

She was placed in reserve on completion of her sea trials and would remain in such a state for a lengthy period of time, ultimately seeing service in the 1970s as a sonar trials ship. In the process she outlived all her fleetmates in Royal Navy service.

Operational history

Completion and reserve

Matapan was built by John Brown & Company. She was launched on 30 April 1945 and finally completed on 5 September 1947.

The ship undertook her builders and acceptance sea trials over a period of two weeks, during which she steamed for a total of 150 hours, arriving at Chatham on 22 September, where she was de-stored. Matapan was initially laid up in Gillingham Reach on the River Medway from 28 October 1947 and was subsequently towed to Devonport on 20 July 1948, where she was prepared for preservation in long-term reserve. She was to remain moored in the River Tamar for the next 20 years.

Conversion to Sonar Trials Ship

In 1961 Matapan was first earmarked for conversion to a sonar trials ship, to replace . It appears that lack of money to pay for the necessary work, may be the reason why this was delayed for so long.

Advances in Soviet nuclear submarine performance during the 1960s rendered the existing NATO sonar equipment, which were based on analogue technology of World War II origin and had limited range,  obsolescent. In 1968 the Admiralty issued a draft Staff Requirement for the Type 2016 hull sonar, which was intended to replace not only the widely used Type 184, but other types of specialist sonars, such as the Types 170, 176 and 177. It used pre-formed digital beams at lower frequencies than previous types, that could track many more targets, whilst using fewer ratings to process the information. The drawback of the use of much lower frequencies however, was the need for a  much longer array. The urgency of the need led to the plan to convert  Matapan being revived, as a test bed for the new equipment.

On 5 January 1970, Matapan was towed to Portsmouth where she began her conversion, that resulted in her appearance becoming radically different from when she was launched in 1945. Additionally, a large bulbous sonar dome was added to her bow. All of her armament was removed and a new deckhouse and bridge were added forward, along with a plated foremast to house additional radars. Towards the stern, she was fitted with a second funnel to vent the exhaust gases from the generators needed to power the sonar, and a helicopter flight deck on a deckhouse aft. The ship was also re-wired and fitted with new operations and control rooms, and additional accommodation for scientific staff. The reconstruction work was completed in July 1972 and she began her sea trials.

Service as Sonar Trials Ship 1973–1977

Upon completion of her sea trials, Matapan entered active service for the very first time, commissioned on 2 February 1973, joining the Admiralty Underwater Weapons Establishment (AUWE), based in Portland. Her trials were conducted initially in British coastal waters, where the sonar operators found that their new equipment was very loud and required the use of ear defenders.

During 1976 she operated in the Atlantic and Caribbean, undertaking trials with the United States Navy, including operating  with the submarine, . During these exercises it was reported by P.O.Moore (Petty Officer, Torpedo and Anti-Submarine Instructor) that: "The crew of USS Tullibee, claimed that having our sonar ping them was like having a metal bucket on your head and someone hitting it with a sledgehammer."

Late in her career, Matapan also undertook testing of an alternative Towed Array Sonar, Type 2031, which offered the improved performance of the Type 2016,  without the cost and space needs of the hull mounted type. The Type 2016 however, had already had a major influence on future warship evolution, as the Royal Navy's new Type 22 frigate was designed to mount the Type 2016, which resulted in a step change in hull size, in comparison to previous frigate designs, and ultimately it saw service in the larger warships of the Royal Navy, including the s and Type 42 destroyers. The towed array Type 2031 and its successor, the Type 2087, manufactured by Thales, have now become the standard equipment of the Royal Navy Type 23 frigates.

Final days

Matapan was decommissioned in August 1977 and laid up at Portsmouth. On 18 May 1979 she was sold to H.K.Vickers and was broken up at Blyth in Northumberland.

References

Publications
 
 
 
 
 

 

Battle-class destroyers of the Royal Navy
Ships built on the River Clyde
1945 ships
Cold War destroyers of the United Kingdom